"Sino Nga Ba Siya" is a song recorded by Filipina singer-Actress Sarah Geronimo. The song was the lead single off her 2011 5× Platinum album One Heart. Released in December 2010 under VIVA Records.

Music video
The Music Video was directed by Paul Basinillo.

Late December 2010, the Music Video was premiered and debuted at 9th position on MYX Music Channel. The song peaked at number 1 on Myx Hit Chart and Pinoy Myx.

26 December 2010, a user uploaded the music video on YouTube and as of November 2014, the video was viewed 10,330,000 times, making Sino Nga Ba Siya the most viewed music video of Sarah Geronimo on YouTube. After a year, the video was uploaded by the official YouTube Channel of Viva Music Group.

Awards and Accolades 
EGG's AllHits.ph named 'Sino Nga Ba Siya' as the 'Most Downloaded Song' during the 25th Awit Awards last 27 November 2012.

References

Sarah Geronimo songs
2010 songs
2010 singles
Tagalog-language songs